Huai Kaeo is a tambon (subdistrict) of Mae On District, in Chiang Mai Province, Thailand. In 2018 it had a total population of 2,819 people.

Administration

Central administration
The tambon is subdivided into 8 administrative villages (muban).

Local administration
The whole area of the subdistrict is covered by the subdistrict administrative organization (SAO) Huai Kaeo (องค์การบริหารส่วนตำบลห้วยแก้ว).

References

External links
Thaitambon.com on Huai Kaeo

Tambon of Chiang Mai province
Populated places in Chiang Mai province